Randolph County Courthouse and Jail is a historic courthouse and jail located at Elkins, Randolph County, West Virginia.  The two buildings were built between 1902 and 1904.  They are constructed of brick and faced with stone with contrasting smooth and textured stone trim.  The courthouse measures 103 feet by 76 feet, with a tower flanking the entrance pavilion at 150 feet tall.  It features a rounded arch entrance in the Richardsonian Romanesque style.  The jail features a massive conical-roofed corner tower.

It was listed on the National Register of Historic Places in 1980.

References

Courthouses on the National Register of Historic Places in West Virginia
Romanesque Revival architecture in West Virginia
Government buildings completed in 1904
Buildings and structures in Elkins, West Virginia
National Register of Historic Places in Randolph County, West Virginia
County courthouses in West Virginia
U.S. Route 250